Sunshine Radio is a network of two radio stations operated by Murfin Media Ltd.

Stations

Sunshine Radio 106.2
Sunshine Radio 855

British radio networks